HE 1523-0901, also named TYC 5594-576-1 or 2MASS J15260106-0911388, is the designation given to a red giant star in the Milky Way galaxy approximately 10,000 light years from Earth. It is thought to be a second generation, Population II, or metal-poor, star ([Fe/H] = −2.95). The star was found in the sample of bright metal-poor halo stars from the Hamburg/ESO Survey by Anna Frebel and collaborators. The group's research was published in the May 10, 2007 issue of The Astrophysical Journal.

Age
The star's age, as measured by ESO's Very Large Telescope, is 13.2 billion years. This makes it among the oldest stars and nearly as old as the estimated age of the universe itself (13.8 billion years as measured by Planck). The measurement uncertainty in the age estimate is 0.7 to 2.7 billion years, depending upon the assumptions made to estimate the uncertainty, although the uncertainty in the relative age of this and other stars using the same method is smaller. HE 1523-0901 is the first star whose age was determined using the decay of the radioactive elements uranium and thorium in tandem with measurements of several neutron capture elements. It is believed to have formed directly from the remnants of the first-generation stars that reached the end of their longevity and exploded as supernovae early in the history of known matter.

However, HE 1523-0901 is slightly younger than the orange dwarf star HD 164922, which the star's age was 13.6 billion years and have 3 planets that orbits around the star

Designation 
The designation "HE 1523-0901" indicates that the star is part of the Hamburg/ESO Survey catalog. A list of astronomical catalogues can be used to find which catalog a star or other object is from based on its prefix. Most objects are listed in several catalogs and will often be known by several different designations.

In the Tycho-2 Catalogue its spectral type is given as F8V, but its color index indicates a surface temperature much cooler than an F8 star should be. Because the spectral type of a star in the A to K star regime is judged by the relative strengths of the absorption lines of the metals relative to the hydrogen Balmer lines, the extreme metal deficiency results in weak metal lines and yields a spuriously early spectral type. If the spectral classification is performed including the metal deficiency, the result is a rather later type, CEMP-no.

Observation
HE 1523-0901 is approximately 0.8 solar masses. It can be viewed particularly well from the southern hemisphere with the use of a small telescope. It can also be observed from central European latitudes.

See also
Iota Draconis
HD 140283
HD 164922
HE 1327-2326
Sneden's Star

References

External links 

Libra (constellation)
Giant stars
F-type main-sequence stars
Population II stars
2MASS objects